Peterborough Lions Rugby Football Club, formerly Westwood RUFC, is an English rugby union team based in Bretton near Peterborough.  The club runs one senior team, a youth academy team, an under-16s side and four junior teams. with the first XV currently playing in Midlands Premier following their relegation from National League 2 North at the end of the 2018–19 season.

Club honours
East Midlands 3 champions: 1991–92
Midlands 2 East (South) champions: 2011–12
Midlands 1 East champions: 2013–14
Midlands Premier v North Premier promotion play-off winner: 2017–18

Notes

References

External links
Official club website

English rugby union teams
Rugby clubs established in 1944